Marco Bechis (born in Santiago, Chile) is a Chilean-Italian film screenwriter and director. His film Garage Olimpo was screened at the 1999 Cannes Film Festival in the Un Certain Regard section.

Selected filmography
 Alambrado (1991)
 Garage Olimpo (1999)
 Figli/Hijos (Sons and Daughters) (2001)
 BirdWatchers (2008)
 The Smile of the Leader (2011)
 The Noise of Memory (2014) web serie
 The Noise of Memory, the film (2015)
 All the Schools of the Kingdom (2015)

References

External links
 

1955 births
Living people
Chilean screenwriters
Male screenwriters
Chilean film directors
Italian film directors
Italian screenwriters
Italian male screenwriters